The President of the National Assembly is the presiding officer of the legislature of Ecuador. In 2009 the National Congress of Ecuador was replaced by the National Assembly. The position of President of the National Assembly has existed since then.

Below is a complete list of office-holders:

See also
List of presidents of the National Congress of Ecuador

References

Ecuador

Lists of Ecuadorian people by occupation
Ecuador politics-related lists